Children of Madness is the second album by Paul Di'Anno's Battlezone. It was released in 1987.The album achieved commercial success

Track listing
All songs by Graham Bath, Paul Di'Anno, and Steve Hopgood except "To The Limit" by Paul Di'Anno.

Side One
"Rip It Up" - 2:44
"Overloaded" - 3:16
"Nuclear Breakdown" - 4:48
"Torch of Hate" - 2:58
"Children of Madness" - 5:17

Side Two
"I Don't Wanna Know" - 3:18
"The Promise" - 3:36
"It's Love" - 3:35
"Metal Tears" - 5:57
"Whispered Rage" - 4:38

Bonus Track (On 2016 Wasabi Records Remaster)
"To The Limit" - 3:54

Personnel

Band members
Paul Di'Anno - lead vocals
Graham Bath - guitar
John Wiggins - guitar
Pete West - bass
Steve Hopgood - drums

Production
Ian Richardson - producer, engineer

References

Paul Di'Anno albums
1987 albums

no:Di'Anno